Enrique Emilio Ros y Pérez (1924 – April 10, 2013) was a Cuban-American businessman, author, and activist opposed to Cuban president Fidel Castro.

Early life
Enrique Ros was born in 1924 in Cienfuegos, Cuba.

Career
Ros hosted radio shows on U.S. government station Radio y Televisión Martí, which broadcasts exclusively to Cuba. He was a strong advocate of retaining the United States embargo against Cuba. He was the author of Revolucion de 1933 en Cuba.

Personal life
Ros was married to Amanda Adato (1926–2011) and they had two children, Enrique Jr. "Henry" and retired U.S. Representative Ileana Ros-Lehtinen, and four grandchildren: Jennifer and Katherine Ros, and Patricia and Rodrigo Lehtinen.

Death
Ros died on April 10, 2013, in a South Miami, Florida hospital from respiratory complications. He was 89.

Books by Enrique Ros
Ros, Enrique 2006 El clandestinaje y la lucha armada contra castro/ The clandestinity and the armed fight against Castro (Cuba y sus Jueces) Ediciones Universal, Miami 
Ros, Enrique 2005 Revolucion de 1933 en Cuba Ediciones Universal, Miami 
Ros, Enrique 2003 Fidel Castro y El Gatillo Alegre: Sus Años Universitarios (Coleccion Cuba y Sus Jueces) Miami 
Ros, Enrique 2002 Ernesto Che Guevara: mito y realidad. Ediciones Universal, Miami. 
Ros, Enrique 1999 Aventura Africana De Fidel Castro (Coleccion Cuba y Sus Jueces) Miami 
Ros, Enrique 1998 Cubanos Combatiente: Peleando En Distingidos Frentes (Coleccion Cuba y Sus Jueces) Miami 
Ros, Enrique 1996 Años Criticos: Del Camino De La Accion Al Camino Del Entendimiento (Coleccion Cuba Y Sus Jueces) Miami 
Ros, Enrique 1995 De Giron a La Crisis De Los Cohetes: La Segunda Derrota (Coleccion Cuba Y Sus Jueces) Miami 
Ros, Enrique and Orlando Bosch 1994 Giron la verdadera historia (Coleccion Cuba y sus jueces) Miami

References

1924 births
2013 deaths
Cuban emigrants to the United States
American people of Spanish descent
People from Cienfuegos
Cuban anti-communists
20th-century Cuban people
20th-century American businesspeople
21st-century Cuban writers
21st-century American businesspeople
American anti-communists
Activists from Florida